Florencia may refer to:

Places
Florencia de Benito Juárez, a municipality in the state of Zacatecas, Mexico
Florencia, Caquetá, a town and municipality in the Department of Caqueta, Colombia
Florencia, Cauca, a town and municipality in the Department of Cauca, Colombia
Florencia, Cuba, a municipality and city in the Ciego de Ávila Province of Cuba

Other
Florencia (given name), the Spanish variant of Florence (given name)
Florencia, the Spanish name of the Italian city Florence
Florencia Airport, Bolivia